Stoke Extinguisher is an EP by NOFX released on November 26, 2013 through Fat Wreck Chords. The EP was released as a six-song CD and a two-song 7". Both versions feature the new title song, "Stoke Extinguisher", as well as "The Shortest Pier", which was originally by Tony Sly and was recorded for The Songs of Tony Sly: A Tribute. The rest of the songs on the CD are b-sides collected from singles from the band's recent album, Self Entitled, although it does not include the alternate version of "She Didn't Lose Her Baby", the b-side from the "My Stepdad's a Cop and My Stepmom's a Domme" 7". The cover was hand painted by Jason Cruz of Strung Out.

Track listings

Personnel
Fat Mike – vocals, bass
Eric Melvin – guitar, vocals
El Hefe – guitar, vocals
Erik Sandin – drums
Jamie McMann –engineer

References

External links

Stoke Extinguisher at YouTube (streamed copy where licensed)

NOFX EPs
2013 EPs
Fat Wreck Chords EPs